Saint-Oradoux-près-Crocq (literally Saint-Oradoux near Crocq) is a commune in the Creuse department in central France.

Geography
The river Tardes forms most of the commune's southwestern border.

Population

See also
Communes of the Creuse department

References

Communes of Creuse